The 2015–16 WRU Challenge Cup, known for sponsorship reasons as the SSE SWALEC Cup, is the 46th WRU Challenge Cup, the annual national rugby union cup competition of Wales. The competition was won by Llandovery who beat Carmarthen Quins 25-18 in the final.

Calendar

Matches

Round 1

Round 2

Quarter-finals

Semi-finals

Final

References

Chall
WRU Challenge Cup